Hashimoto Kansetsu (November 10, 1883 – February 26, 1945) was a painter of nihonga (Japanese-style paintings) who was active in the Kyoto art world during the Showa and Taisho eras.

Born in Kobe, he was the son of the painter Hashimoto Kaikan, from whom he gained a love of Chinese culture. He studied at Chikujokai, a private school established by the famous nihonga painter Takeuchi Seihō (1864–1942), but eventually withdrew due to differences of opinion. He visited Europe in 1921 and after that spent part of almost every year in China. Many of his paintings were inspired by Chinese scenery or Chinese classical literature. His former residence in Kyoto is now a museum of his work called the Hakusasonso, or Hashimoto Kansetsu Memorial House.

References

Ellen P. Conant, Steven D. Owyoung, J. Thomas Rimer. (1995). Nihonga: Transcending the Past: Japanese-style Painting, 1868-1968. St. Louis: St. Louis Art Museum.
Louis Frederic. (2005). Japan Encyclopedia (Harvard University Press Reference Library). Boston, Harvard University Press.

External links

Hashimoto Kansetsu Memorial House ;
Hakusasonso Hashimoto Kansetsu Garden and Museum 

1945 deaths
1883 births
People from Kobe
20th-century Japanese painters
Imperial household artists